Auvergnat Cola is a French soft drink brand founded in 2009 in Auvergne by the societé Julhes, based in Saint-Flour, Cantal, to market an alternative cola drink. In March 2011 it was acquired by Audebert Boissons, based in Bort-les-Orgues.

History 
The origins of Auvergnat Cola lie with Jean-Philippe Nicolaux, head of the societé Julhes, a tripe production company, who wanted to diversify his company's products. After looking for a possible niche product, he turned his attention to mass consumer products, seeking one with strong regional popularity and identity, but which would not have a local competitor or require large-scale production and reduced profit margins. He was convinced that this type of product is only viable as an adjunct to an existing enterprise, where it can be added to the existing structure of the business and economies of scale be realised by that means. The idea of Auvergnat Cola came to him when he was on holiday in Corsica and was drinking the local Corsica Cola. (Other pre-existing regional colas in France included Breizh Cola in Brittany, Fada Cola in Marseille and Chtilà Cola, since renamed Ch'nord Cola, in Nord-Pas-de-Calais, and Meuh Cola in Normandy, Montania Cola in Chambéry and Poitou Cola have since been launched.)

Initial goal 
The objective was to appeal to the apple growers in the Auvergne amongst both consumers and food service professionals, and in addition to the attachment of many Parisians to their roots in the region, in particular that of owners of bars and brasseries that have succeeded Auvergne-style bougnats. To be successful, Auvergne Cola would have to be launched in a humorous manner, playing on a quirky, maybe even a completely crazy image. The minimum order to start production would be 20,000 units, and the break-even point would be 50,000 units.

The cola recipe was intentionally as close as possible to that of Coca-Cola, because customers were used to it, but with the addition of gentian for a regional touch.

Targets 
In the first phase, the commercial targets were to be regional: restaurant operators, large retailers which were already customers of Julhes, and, to broaden the customer base beyond those who usually bought tripe, local drink distributors.

Implementation 
Planning and preparation included the cola recipe and decisions about the name, a slogan— (local dialect variously glossed as "It's going to make everything explode" and "It makes everything fizz, nom de Dieu"), the bottle shape and the label design featuring a volcano, and lasted from October to December 2008. The first sample presentation of the product took place at SIRHA, the international food and hospitality trade fair in Lyon and immediately led to orders. The Julhes display, usually not busy, had queues in front of it. In four days, the first lot of 20,000 bottles sold out prior to production and customers excitedly awaited the actual appearance of the product. The official launch was at the agriculture trade fair on 25 February 2009, when bottles of Auvergnat Cola were finally available.

In the media and on the internet, there has been appreciation for the humorous way the product is presented, its rebel side and its down-to-earth and regional aspects, in complete contrast to the current tendency towards globalisation of business and reminiscent of a mosquito attacking a giant of the fizzy drink business. The associated blogs, particularly on Facebook, are often well trafficked.

Auvergnat Cola strikes everyone as resembling a big dose of laughter and sunshine alleviating the grey reality of today, between the global economic and financial crisis, the battle over Roquefort in the United States and other problems large and small. A website was created for the product, maintaining a high level of humour, with totally unconventional animation, the opportunity to register to receive news about the product and links to Facebook and Twitter.

Goals reached 
The goal had been to sell the minimum initial production of 50,000 units within the first year; actual sales had reached 500,000, ten times that, after three months and 750,000 after four months. Initial orders were renewed, which seemed to be a sign that customers were beginning to form a habit of buying the product, after initially trying it out of curiosity. Reorders from vendors demonstrated that the public liked it. Auvergnat Cola had also brought considerable attention to Julhes, and there was an unexpected degree of identification with it on the part of Auvergne businesses, cafés, restaurants and brasseries, and engagement with the brand's internet presence. Aurélien Rougerie, who plays international rugby for France and captains ASM Clermont Auvergne, volunteered to be a spokesman for the product.

Jean-Philippe Nicolaux arranged various partnerships for the brand, both with tastemakers such as Les toques d'Auvergnes, an association of chefs in the region which no longer serve any other cola, and with sports clubs which he sponsored with a donation of bottles of the product.

Production of 1 million units by the end of 2009 was an initial objective; this mark was reached in time for le quatorze juillet and two million by April 2010.

Jean-Philippe and Philippe 
Jean-Philippe Nicolaux then decided to devote himself exclusively to Auvergnat Cola and to split it off from Julhes in early 2010. Seeking a business partnership for both production and distribution, he found Philippe Audebert, CEO of Audebert Boissons (beverages), a company founded in 1901 in Bort-les-Orgues by Jacques Audebert to sell lemonade and wine. Audebert already had an extensive distribution network and a bottling plant and in March 2011 acquired Auvergnat Cola, which has replaced their Le Bougnat brand of soft drinks; they now use that brand name only for their beers. Bougnat Cola had launched as a rival a few months after Auvergne Cola, although the brand name had been registered in 2004.

Manufacturing 
Glass bottles, sold in bars, are produced in Bort-les-Orgues. All other forms of the company's drinks are bottled near Perpignan.

Products 

Auvergnat Cola, the company's signature product, with the slogan , produced in all formats:
1.5-litre plastic bottles (for supermarkets)
Four-packs of 50-centilitre plastic bottles (for supermarkets and takeaways)
Six-packs of 33-centilitre plastic bottles (for supermarkets and takeaways)
Aluminium cans (for takeaways and soft drink machines)
33-centilitre glass bottles (for cafés, restaurants and bars)
Auvergne Cola Zéro, originally with sucralose, now reformulated with a combination of two sweeteners to taste sweeter, more flavourful, and more like the original
Auvergnat Tonic, a tonic water with a dash of gentian from the Auvergne Volcanoes Regional Nature Park
Auvergnat lemonade
Auvergnat Thé Pêche (peach tea), an uncarbonated, lightly sweetened drink flavoured with black tea and concentrated peach juice

References

External links

Cola
Products introduced in 2009
Auvergne